Anacridium moestum, the camouflaged tree locust, is a species of grasshopper belonging to the family Acrididae, that is native to Africa south of the equator. It is similar in appearance to the Southern African desert locust, Schistocerca gregaria flavicentris. It is likewise brownish, large and slender, but mostly arboreal in its habits.

Description
These large and slender locusts show a mottled reddish brown or grey body, with a finely speckled green tegmina. Hind wings are pale blue with a black band near the base. Hind tibiae are purplish. Nymphs (hoppers) are yellowish green. The eyes and face are vertically striped.

Distribution and habitat
This species is native and widespread in southern and south tropical Africa. These grasshoppers live on trees or shrubs in grassland with acacias.

Biology
Anacridium moestum feeds on Acacia, Zizyphus, Capparis aphelia, and gum trees. These tree locusts may damage crops and fruit trees, but only occasionally swarm.

Bibliography
Burr (1903) Orthoptera Fam. Eumasticidae, Genera Insectorum, V. Verteneuil & L. Desmet, Brussels 15:1-23, pl 1
COPR (Centre for Overseas Pest Research) (1982), The Locust and Grasshopper Agricultural Manual
Dirsh (1965), The African Genera of Acridoidea, Cambridge University Press, Antilocust Centre, London 579 pp.
Johnsen (1991) Acrididae: Catantopinae, Cyrtacanthacridinae, Acridinae, The Acridoidea of Botswana (Acridoidea of Botswana) 2:132-284
Johnston, H.B. (1956), Annotated catalogue of African grasshoppers, The Cambridge University Press, Cambridge 833 pp.
Johnston, H.B. (1968), Annotated catalogue of African grasshoppers, The Cambridge University Press, Cambridge Suppl:448 pp.
Kirby, W.F. (1910), A Synonymic Catalogue of Orthoptera (Orthoptera Saltatoria, Locustidae vel Acridiidae), British Museum (Natural History), London 3(2):674 pp.
Picker, Griffiths & Weaving (2005), Field Guide to Insects of Southern Africa, Struik Publishers, South Africa 444 pp.
Rehn, J.A.G. (1942) New South African Bird-Locust of the Genus Anacridium (Orthoptera, Acrididae, Cyrtacanthacridinae), Notulae Naturae 110
Rehn, J.A.G. (1944) South African bird-locust records and notes (Orthoptera, Acrididae, Cyrtacanthacridinae, group Cyrtacanthacres), Notulae Naturae 137:11 pp.
Serville (1838[1839]), Histoire naturelle des insectes. Orthoptères, Librairie Encyclopédique de Roret, Paris i-xviii, 1-776, pl. 1-14
Uvarov & G.B. Popov (1957) The saltatorial Orthoptera of Socotra, Zoological Journal of the Linnean Society, London (Zool. J. Linn. Soc.) 43:359-389
Uvarov (1923) A revision of the Old World Cyrtacanthacrini (Orthoptera, Acrididae). II. Genera Phyxacra to Willemsea, Annals and Magazine of Natural History, London (Ann. Mag. nat. Hist.) 9 11:473-490
Uvarov (1966), Grasshoppers & Locusts. A Handbook of General Acridology, Cambridge University Press, London 1:481 pp.

References

Acrididae
Insects described in 1838